Rebecca van der Vegt (born 10 April 1964) is a former association football player who represented New Zealand at international level.

Van der Vegt made her Football Ferns début in a 1–2 loss to Australia on 4 October 1981, and finished her international career with eight caps to her credit.

References

1964 births
Living people
New Zealand women's association footballers
New Zealand women's international footballers
Women's association footballers not categorized by position